Anthon Charmig (born 25 March 1998) is a Danish cyclist, who currently rides for UCI ProTeam .

Major results

2014
 2nd Time trial, National Junior Road Championships
2015
 National Junior Road Championships
1st  Time trial
2nd Road race
 1st  Overall Trophée Centre Morbihan
1st  Young rider classification
 2nd Overall Aubel–Thimister–La Gleize
 2nd Trofeo Emilio Paganessi
 3rd Overall Tour du Pays de Vaud
1st  Young rider classification
2016
 4th Trofeo Emilio Paganessi
2019
 1st Taiwan KOM Challenge
2020
 2nd  Road race, UEC European Under-23 Road Championships
 3rd Overall Randers Bike Week
2021
 1st  Mountains classification, Tour of Norway
 2nd Overall Alpes Isère Tour
 6th Overall Tour of Turkey
 7th Overall Danmark Rundt
2022
 2nd Overall Czech Cycling Tour
 5th Overall Tour of Oman
1st  Young rider classification
1st Stage 3
 7th Overall Saudi Tour
 9th Overall Tour de Hongrie
 10th Overall Danmark Rundt

References

External links

1998 births
Living people
Danish male cyclists
Sportspeople from Aarhus